Ben Koppelman (born January 2, 1980) is an American politician who has served in the North Dakota House of Representatives from the 16th district since 2012.

References

External links

1980 births
Living people
Republican Party members of the North Dakota House of Representatives
21st-century American politicians